Auke Bay is a neighborhood located in the city and borough of Juneau, Alaska, that contains Auke Bay Harbor, Auke Lake, the University of Alaska Southeast, an elementary school, a church, a post office, a bar, a coffee shop, a waffle house, a thrift shop, a Thai restaurant, and one convenience store. The view of the Mendenhall Glacier behind Auke Bay and Mount McGinnis towering over Auke Lake are some of the most popular photo opportunities in Juneau. The ferry terminal of the Alaska Marine Highway system is also located further out the road in Auke Bay at about 14 miles. The flamingo house on Auke Lake is a local attraction, known for its topical or weather-related formations of pink lawn flamingos. Whale watchings targeting curious humpbacks are available. Humpbacks in these areas are known to demonstrate special feeding methods, so-called "bubble-net feeding", and come very close to shores.

The Coast Guard cutter Liberty is homeported at the Auke Bay Harbor.

Auke Bay takes its name from the native Auke people, a part of the Tlingit tribe.

Climate
Auke Bay has a warm-summer humid continental climate (Köppen Dfb)

Public Safety
Fire and EMS coverage is provided by Capital City Fire Rescue. Originally, the Auke Bay Volunteer Fire Department provided services beginning in 1952 under the guiding principal of "neighbors helping neighbors." In 1992, Auke Bay VFD merged along with five other fire departments to become Capital City Fire & Rescue, which serves the majority of the Juneau area. The Auke Bay Fire Station is covered by volunteer firefighters. At night, the station is staffed by "Live-In" Resident Volunteer Firefighters, who are allowed to reside in the station rent-free in exchange for staffing emergency vehicles a required amount of time per month.

Law enforcement is provided primarily by Juneau Police Department, who are supported by the Alaska State Troopers and U.S. Forest Service law enforcement.

The United States Coast Guard Cutter Reef Shark,  a Marine-Protector Class Patrol Boat, is homeported out of Auke Bay / Statter Harbor. The cutter's primary mission set includes law enforcement, search and rescue, military operations, and environmental protection. During the summer months, USCG Small Boat Station Juneau maintains a 45' Motor Lifeboat at Liberty's moorings, providing a faster search and rescue asset as well as law enforcement capability to the immediate harbor area.

Demographics

Auke Bay first appeared on the 1880 U.S. Census as three separate and unnamed "Auk Villages" with a combined total of 640 Auke Tlingit. These settlements extended beyond the present-day area near Juneau to include Admiralty Island and Douglas Island. In 1890, these were consolidated by the census and reported as "Auk Settlements." It returned simply as "Auke" in 1900 and 1910. It did not report again separately until 1950, by which time it was a suburb of Juneau. It did not appear in 1960, but returned in 1970, just before all locales within Juneau Borough were consolidated into the city of Juneau.

Alaska Clipper Stop 
For several months in 1940, Auke Bay was a stop for Pan American Airways "Alaska Clipper".  The Alaska Clipper was a Sikorsky S-42B four-engine flying boat.  The aircraft was originally named "Bermuda Clipper" and served the Baltimore - Bermuda route.  In 1940 it was renamed Alaska Clipper and flew from Matthews Beach on Lake Washington in Seattle to Auke Bay stopping in Ketchikan.  The first flight landed in Auke Bay on June 14, 1940 and the last took place on November 6, 1940.  After its Alaska service, the plane was renamed again, this time "Hong Kong Clipper II", and began service on the Hong Kong - Manila route.  The aircraft was destroyed by Japanese bombing in Hong Kong Harbor on December 8, 1941.

Auke Bay Marine Station 
For forty-seven years, Auke Bay was the home of Auke Bay Laboratories, the primary US Government facility researching commercially important fisheries in Alaska.  Its studies included estimates of abundance of salmon, sablefish, crabs, and other commercial stocks, and the impact of fishing, development, and industry on those stocks and the habitat on which they rely.

The original Auke Bay Marine Station was funded by Congress in 1958–1959 and opened in 1960.   The 4-acre facility was declared surplus by the US Government in 2016, after the Auke Bay Laboratories’ headquarters was moved to the new Ted Stevens Marine Research Institute in 2007.  In 2017, an agreement was reached whereby the Federal Government would give part of the property to the University of Alaska – Southeast to support its marine biology program, and part of it to the Juneau Docks and Harbors Division to allow for the expansion of its Statter Harbor facilities in Auke Bay.

References

External links

 Auke Bay at the Community Database Online from the Alaska Division of Community and Regional Affairs
 http://abes.juneauschools.org
 http://www.afsc.noaa.gov/abl
 http://seniortravel.about.com/od/Alaska/ss/auke-bay-alaska-whale-watching.htm 
https://www.aukebay.org/

Populated coastal places in Alaska on the Pacific Ocean
Populated places in Juneau, Alaska
Tlingit